Knobel (/ˈnoʊbəl/) is a city in Clay County, Arkansas, United States. The population was 147 at the 2020 census.

History

Knobel was established in the 1870s as a stop along the St. Louis, Iron Mountain and Southern Railway.  A post office with the name “Knobel” was operating in the town by 1874. In 1884, the railroad constructed a large hotel, Knobel House, and a town was platted shortly afterward.  Knobel incorporated in 1896.

Geography
Knobel is located at  (36.319360, -90.601780). The city lies southwest of Corning along Arkansas Highway 90.

According to the United States Census Bureau, the town has a total area of 1.1 km2 (0.4 mi2), all land.

Demographics

As of the census of 2000, there were 358 people, 144 households, and 101 families residing in the town.  The population density was 329.1/km2 (860.1/mi2).  There were 156 housing units at an average density of 143.4/km2 (374.8/mi2).  The racial makeup of the town was 97.77% White, 0.56% Black or African American and 1.68% Native American.  2.79% of the population were Hispanic or Latino of any race.

There were 144 households, out of which 34.0% had children under the age of 18 living with them, 56.3% were married couples living together, 8.3% had a female householder with no husband present, and 29.2% were non-families. 26.4% of all households were made up of individuals, and 16.0% had someone living alone who was 65 years of age or older.  The average household size was 2.49 and the average family size was 2.95.

In the town, the population was spread out, with 27.9% under the age of 18, 9.5% from 18 to 24, 29.3% from 25 to 44, 18.7% from 45 to 64, and 14.5% who were 65 years of age or older.  The median age was 34 years. For every 100 females, there were 103.4 males.  For every 100 females age 18 and over, there were 101.6 males.

The median income for a household in the town was $18,750, and the median income for a family was $32,000. Males had a median income of $21,705 versus $15,000 for females. The per capita income for the town was $10,624.  About 20.0% of families and 25.2% of the population were below the poverty line, including 13.6% of those under age 18 and 36.2% of those age 65 or over.

Education
The Corning School District operates public schools. The Knobel School District consolidated into the Corning School District on July 1, 1985.

References

Cities in Clay County, Arkansas
Cities in Arkansas